Wells-in-the-Field is a hamlet in the civil parish of Laverstoke situated in the North Wessex Downs Area of Outstanding Natural Beauty in the Basingstoke and Deane district of Hampshire, England. Its nearest town is Whitchurch, which lies approximately 1.2 miles (1.9 km) south-west from the hamlet.

Villages in Hampshire